Vessi is a Canadian footwear company. They're best known for creating the World's first 100% waterproof knit shoes, made with their patented Dyma-tex technology. Originally selling online only, they opened their first retail store in 2022 at Metropolis at Metrotown in Burnaby, British Columbia.

References

Clothing brands of Canada
Companies based in Vancouver